John Brocklesby was an English-American academic who served as president of Trinity College in Hartford, Connecticut. 

He was born in England in 1811, and came to the United States with his father. He graduated from Trinity College in 1835, and later taught mathematics and natural philosophy at the college.

References

Presidents of Trinity College (Connecticut)
Trinity College (Connecticut) faculty

1811 births
Year of death missing